Asa Smith may refer to:

 Asa Dodge Smith (1804–1877), president of Dartmouth College
 Asa Smith (politician) (1829–1907), warden of the Borough of Norwalk, Connecticut